The 2019–20 Pittsburgh Penguins season was the 53rd season for the National Hockey League team that was established on June 5, 1967. This season saw the team try to extend their playoffs streak to 14 seasons.

The season was suspended by the league officials on March 12, 2020, after several other professional and collegiate sports organizations followed suit as a result of the ongoing COVID-19 pandemic. On May 26, the NHL regular season was officially declared over with the remaining games being cancelled. The Penguins advanced to the playoffs. Prior to the pause however, after taking the lead in the Metropolitan Division on February 18, the Penguins suffered a crucial six-game losing streak which coincided with both the Washington Capitals and Philadelphia Flyers (the latter of whom were on a nine-game winning streak) surpassing the Penguins in the standings. This dropped the Penguins into third in the division and fifth in the conference. These events loomed large as the modified playoff format cost the Penguins of being amongst the top four teams in the conference of having a bye directly into the first round. When the Penguins returned to play as the fifth-seed, they were upset in four games to the twelfth-seeded Montreal Canadiens in the best-of-five qualifying round.

Standings

Divisional standings

Eastern Conference

Schedule and results

Preseason
The preseason schedule was published on June 18, 2019.

|- style="background:#ffc;"
| 1 || September 16 || Pittsburgh || 4–5  || Buffalo || Pegula Ice Arena || 5,497 || 0–0–1
|- style="background:#cfc;"
| 2 || September 19 || Columbus || 1–4 || Pittsburgh || PPG Paints Arena || 15,649 || 1–0–1
|- style="background:#fcf;"
| 3 || September 21 || Pittsburgh ||  1–3 || Columbus || Nationwide Arena || 13,637 || 1–1–1
|- style="background:#ffc;"
| 4 || September 22 || Pittsburgh || 2–3  || Detroit || Little Caesars Arena || 16,093 || 1–1–2 
|- style="background:#cfc;"
| 5 || September 25 || Detroit || 2–4 || Pittsburgh || PPG Paints Arena || 15,112 || 2–1–2
|- style="background:#ffc;"
| 6 || September 28 || Buffalo || 3–2  || Pittsburgh || PPG Paints Arena || 18,325 || 2–1–3
|-

|- style="text-align:center;"
| Legend:       = Win       = Loss       = OT/SO Loss

Regular season
The regular season schedule was published on June 25, 2019.

|- style="background:#fcf;"
| 1 || October 3 || Buffalo || 3–1 || Pittsburgh || PPG Paints Arena || 18,616 || 0–1–0 || 0
|- style="background:#cfc;"
| 2 || October 5 || Columbus || 2–7 || Pittsburgh || PPG Paints Arena || 18,595 || 1–1–0 || 2 
|- style="background:#fcf;"
| 3 || October 8 || Winnipeg || 4–1 || Pittsburgh || PPG Paints Arena || 18,420 || 1–2–0 || 2
|- style="background:#cfc;"
| 4 || October 10 || Anaheim || 1–2 || Pittsburgh || PPG Paints Arena || 18,414 || 2–2–0 || 4 
|- style="background:#cfc;"
| 5 || October 12 || Pittsburgh || 7–4 || Minnesota || Xcel Energy Center || 19,157 || 3–2–0 || 6 
|- style="background:#cfc;"
| 6 || October 13 || Pittsburgh || 7–2 || Winnipeg || Bell MTS Place || 15,325 || 4–2–0 || 8
|- style="background:#cfc;"
| 7 || October 16 || Colorado || 2–3  || Pittsburgh || PPG Paints Arena || 18,458 || 5–2–0 || 10
|- style="background:#cfc;"
| 8 || October 18 || Dallas || 2–4 || Pittsburgh || PPG Paints Arena || 18,482 || 6–2–0 || 12
|- style="background:#fcf;"
| 9 || October 19 || Vegas || 3–0 || Pittsburgh || PPG Paints Arena || 19,610 || 6–3–0 || 12
|- style="background:#fcf;"
| 10 || October 22 || Pittsburgh || 2–4 || Florida || BB&T Center || 12,738 || 6–4–0 || 12
|- style="background:#fcf;"
| 11 || October 23 || Pittsburgh || 2–3 || Tampa Bay || Amalie Arena || 19,092 || 6–5–0 || 12
|- style="background:#cfc;"
| 12 || October 26 || Pittsburgh || 3–0 || Dallas || American Airlines Center || 18,532 || 7–5–0 || 14
|- style="background:#cfc;"
| 13 || October 29 || Philadelphia || 1–7 || Pittsburgh || PPG Paints Arena || 18,560 || 8–5–0 || 16 
|-

|- style="background:#ffc;"
| 14 || November 2 || Edmonton || 2–1  || Pittsburgh || PPG Paints Arena || 18,618 || 8–5–1 || 17
|- style="background:#fcf;"
| 15 || November 4 || Pittsburgh || 4–6 || Boston || TD Garden || 17,193 || 8–6–1 || 17
|- style="background:#cfc;"
| 16 || November 7 || Pittsburgh || 4–3  || NY Islanders || Barclays Center || 12,613 || 9–6–1 || 19 
|- style="background:#cfc;"
| 17 || November 9 || Chicago || 2–3  || Pittsburgh || PPG Paints Arena || 18,653 || 10–6–1 || 21 
|- style="background:#ffc;"
| 18 || November 12 || Pittsburgh || 2–3  || NY Rangers || Madison Square Garden || 16,904 || 10–6–2 || 22
|- style="background:#fcf;"
| 19 || November 15 || Pittsburgh || 1–2 || New Jersey || Prudential Center || 16,514 || 10–7–2 || 22
|- style="background:#cfc;"
| 20 || November 16 || Toronto || 1–6 || Pittsburgh || PPG Paints Arena || 18,587 || 11–7–2 || 24
|- style="background:#ffc;"
| 21 || November 19 || NY Islanders || 5–4  || Pittsburgh || PPG Paints Arena || 18,411 || 11–7–3 || 25
|- style="background:#ffc;"
| 22 || November 21 || Pittsburgh || 3–4  || NY Islanders || Barclays Center || 13,212 || 11–7–4 || 26
|- style="background:#cfc;"
| 23 || November 22 || New Jersey || 1–4 || Pittsburgh || PPG Paints Arena || 18,420 || 12–7–4 || 28
|- style="background:#cfc;"
| 24 || November 25 || Calgary || 2–3  || Pittsburgh || PPG Paints Arena || 18,437 || 13–7–4 || 30
|- style="background:#cfc;"
| 25 || November 27 || Vancouver || 6–8 || Pittsburgh || PPG Paints Arena || 18,465 || 14–7–4 || 32
|- style="background:#fcf;"
| 26 || November 29 || Pittsburgh || 2–5 || Columbus || Nationwide Arena || 17,402 || 14–8–4 || 32
|- style="background:#fcf;"
| 27 || November 30 || Pittsburgh || 2–5 || St. Louis || Enterprise Center || 18,096 || 14–9–4 || 32
|-

|- style="background:#cfc;"
| 28 || December 4 || St. Louis || 0–3 || Pittsburgh || PPG Paints Arena || 18,411 || 15–9–4 || 34
|- style="background:#cfc;"
| 29 || December 6 || Arizona || 0–2 || Pittsburgh || PPG Paints Arena || 18,432 || 16–9–4 || 36
|- style="background:#cfc;"
| 30 || December 7 || Pittsburgh || 5–3 || Detroit || Little Caesars Arena || 19,515 || 17–9–4 || 38 
|- style="background:#fcf;"
| 31 || December 10 || Montreal || 4–1 || Pittsburgh || PPG Paints Arena || 18,422 || 17–10–4 || 38
|- style="background:#cfc;"
| 32 || December 12 || Columbus || 0–1  || Pittsburgh || PPG Paints Arena || 18,415 || 18–10–4 || 40
|- style="background:#cfc;"
| 33 || December 14 || Los Angeles || 4–5  || Pittsburgh || PPG Paints Arena || 18,581 || 19–10–4 || 42 
|- style="background:#cfc;"
| 34 || December 17 || Pittsburgh || 4–1 || Calgary || Scotiabank Saddledome || 18,412 || 20–10–4 || 44
|- style="background:#cfc;"
| 35 || December 20 || Pittsburgh || 5–2 || Edmonton || Rogers Place || 18,347 || 21–10–4 || 46
|- style="background:#fcf;"
| 36 || December 21 || Pittsburgh || 1–4 || Vancouver || Rogers Arena || 18,285 || 21–11–4 || 46
|- style="background:#cfc;"
| 37 || December 27 || Pittsburgh || 5–2 || Nashville || Bridgestone Arena || 17,849 || 22–11–4 || 48
|- style="background:#cfc;"
| 38 || December 28 || Nashville || 4–6 || Pittsburgh || PPG Paints Arena || 18,628 || 23–11–4 || 50
|- style="background:#cfc;"
| 39 || December 30 || Ottawa || 2–5 || Pittsburgh || PPG Paints Arena || 18,653 || 24–11–4 || 52
|-

|- style="background:#ffc;"
| 40 || January 2 || San Jose || 3–2  || Pittsburgh || PPG Paints Arena || 18,620 || 24–11–5 || 53
|- style="background:#cfc;"
| 41 || January 4 || Pittsburgh || 3–2  || Montreal || Bell Centre || 21,302 || 25–11–5 || 55 
|- style="background:#fcf;"
| 42 || January 5 || Florida || 4–1 || Pittsburgh || PPG Paints Arena || 18,564 || 25–12–5 || 55 
|- style="background:#cfc;"
| 43 || January 7 || Pittsburgh || 4–3 || Vegas || T-Mobile Arena || 18,298 || 26–12–5 || 57
|- style="background:#cfc;"
| 44 || January 10 || Pittsburgh || 4–3  || Colorado || Pepsi Center || 18,132 || 27–12–5 || 59
|- style="background:#cfc;"
| 45 || January 12 || Pittsburgh || 4–3  || Arizona || Gila River Arena || 13,755 || 28–12–5 || 61
|- style="background:#cfc;"
| 46 || January 14 || Minnesota || 3–7 || Pittsburgh || PPG Paints Arena || 18,545 || 29–12–5 || 63
|- style="background:#fcf;"
| 47 || January 16 || Pittsburgh || 1–4 || Boston || TD Garden || 17,850 || 29–13–5 || 63
|- style="background:#cfc;"
| 48 || January 17 || Pittsburgh || 2–1  || Detroit || Little Caesars Arena || 19,515 || 30–13–5 || 65
|- style="background:#cfc;"
| 49 || January 19 || Boston || 3–4 || Pittsburgh || PPG Paints Arena || 18,655 || 31–13–5 || 67
|- style="background:#fcf;"
| 50 || January 21 || Pittsburgh || 0–3 || Philadelphia || Wells Fargo Center || 19,120 || 31–14–5 || 67 
|- style="background:#cfc;"
| 51 || January 31 || Philadelphia || 3–4  || Pittsburgh || PPG Paints Arena || 18,647 || 32–14–5 || 69
|-

|- style="background:#cfc;"
| 52 || February 2 || Pittsburgh || 4–3 || Washington || Capital One Arena || 18,573 || 33–14–5 || 71
|- style="background:#fcf;"
| 53 || February 6 || Pittsburgh || 2–4 || Tampa Bay || Amalie Arena || 19,092 || 33–15–5 || 71 
|- style="background:#cfc;"
| 54 || February 8 || Pittsburgh || 3–2 || Florida || BB&T Center || 17,773 || 34–15–5 || 73
|- style="background:#ffc;"
| 55 || February 11 || Tampa Bay || 2–1  || Pittsburgh || PPG Paints Arena || 18,445 || 34–15–6 || 74
|- style="background:#cfc;"
| 56 || February 14 || Montreal || 1–4 || Pittsburgh || PPG Paints Arena || 18,650 || 35–15–6 || 76
|- style="background:#cfc;"
| 57 || February 16 || Detroit || 1–5 || Pittsburgh || PPG Paints Arena || 18,654 || 36–15–6 || 78 
|- style="background:#cfc;"
| 58 || February 18 || Toronto || 2–5 || Pittsburgh || PPG Paints Arena || 18,466 || 37–15–6 || 80 
|- style="background:#fcf;"
| 59 || February 20 || Pittsburgh || 0–4 || Toronto || Scotiabank Arena || 19,386 || 37–16–6 || 80
|- style="background:#fcf;"
| 60 || February 22 || Buffalo || 5–2 || Pittsburgh || PPG Paints Arena || 18,620 || 37–17–6 || 80
|- style="background:#fcf;"
| 61 || February 23 || Pittsburgh || 3–5 || Washington || Capital One Arena || 18,573 || 37–18–6 || 80
|- style="background:#fcf;"
| 62 || February 26 || Pittsburgh || 1–2 || Los Angeles || Staples Center || 16,898 || 37–19–6 || 80
|- style="background:#fcf;"
| 63 || February 28 || Pittsburgh || 2–3 || Anaheim || Honda Center || 16,588 || 37–20–6 || 80
|- style="background:#fcf;"
| 64 || February 29 || Pittsburgh || 0–5 || San Jose || SAP Center || 17,562 || 37–21–6 || 80
|-

|- style="background:#cfc;"
| 65 || March 3 || Ottawa || 3–7 || Pittsburgh || PPG Paints Arena || 18,455 || 38–21–6 || 82
|- style="background:#cfc;"
| 66 || March 5 || Pittsburgh || 4–2 || Buffalo || KeyBank Center || 18,236 || 39–21–6 || 84
|- style="background:#fcf;"
| 67 || March 7 || Washington || 5–2 || Pittsburgh || PPG Paints Arena || 18,656 || 39–22–6 || 84
|- style="background:#fcf;"
| 68 || March 8 || Carolina || 6–2 || Pittsburgh || PPG Paints Arena || 18,548 || 39–23–6 || 84
|- style="background:#cfc;"
| 69 || March 10 || Pittsburgh || 5–2 || New Jersey || Prudential Center || 13,473 || 40–23–6 || 86
|-

|- style="background:#;"
| 70 || March 12 || Pittsburgh || Columbus || Nationwide Arena
|- style="background:#;"
| 71 || March 14 || Pittsburgh || Carolina || PNC Arena
|- style="background:#;"
| 72 || March 15 || NY Islanders || Pittsburgh || PPG Paints Arena
|- style="background:#;"
| 73 || March 18 || Pittsburgh || NY Rangers || Madison Square Garden
|- style="background:#;"
| 74 || March 20 || NY Rangers || Pittsburgh || PPG Paints Arena
|- style="background:#;"
| 75 || March 22 || Washington || Pittsburgh || PPG Paints Arena
|- style="background:#;"
| 76 || March 24 || Carolina || Pittsburgh || PPG Paints Arena
|- style="background:#;"
| 77 || March 25 || Pittsburgh || Chicago || United Center
|- style="background:#;"
| 78 || March 28 || Pittsburgh || Carolina || PNC Arena
|- style="background:#;"
| 79 || March 29 || Pittsburgh || Philadelphia || Wells Fargo Center
|- style="background:#;"
| 80 || March 31 || New Jersey || Pittsburgh || PPG Paints Arena
|- style="background:#;"
| 81 || April 2 || NY Rangers || Pittsburgh || PPG Paints Arena
|- style="background:#;"
| 82 || April 4 || Pittsburgh || Ottawa || Canadian Tire Centre
|-

|- style="text-align:center;"
| Legend:       = Win       = Loss       = OT/SO Loss

Playoffs

The Penguins were defeated by the Montreal Canadiens in the qualifying round in four games.

|- style="background:#fcf;"
| 1 || August 1 || Montreal || 3–2 || Pittsburgh || OT || Murray || 0–1 || Recap
|- style="background:#cfc;"
| 2 || August 3 || Montreal || 1–3 || Pittsburgh ||  || Murray || 1–1 || Recap
|- style="background:#fcf;"
| 3 || August 5 || Pittsburgh || 3–4 || Montreal ||  || Murray || 1–2 || Recap
|- style="background:#fcf;"
| 4 || August 7 || Pittsburgh || 0–2 || Montreal ||  || Jarry || 1–3 || Recap
|-

|-
| Legend:       = Win       = Loss

Player statistics

Skaters

Goaltenders

†Denotes player spent time with another team before joining the Penguins. Stats reflect time with the Penguins only.
‡Denotes player was traded mid-season. Stats reflect time with the Penguins only.
Bold/italics denotes franchise record.

Transactions
The Penguins have been involved in the following transactions during the 2019–20 season.

Trades

  - Third-round pick becomes a second-rounder if the Pittsburgh Penguins win the Stanley Cup in 2020.

Free agents

Waivers

Contract terminations

Retirement

Signings 

  - Contract extension.

Draft picks

Below are the Pittsburgh Penguins' selections at the 2019 NHL Entry Draft, which was held on June 21 and 22, 2019, at Rogers Arena in Vancouver, British Columbia.

Notes:
 - The Chicago Blackhawks' third-round pick went to the Pittsburgh Penguins as the result of a trade on June 22, 2019, that sent Buffalo's fourth-round pick, Tampa Bay's fifth-round pick and a seventh-round pick all in 2019 (98th, 151st and 207th overall) to Arizona in exchange for this pick.

 The Vegas Golden Knights' seventh-round pick went to the Pittsburgh Penguins as the result of a trade on June 23, 2018, that sent a seventh-round pick in 2018 to Vegas in exchange for this pick.

 The Washington Capitals' seventh-round pick went to the Pittsburgh Penguins as the result of a trade on June 22, 2019, that sent a seventh-round pick in 2020 to San Jose in exchange for this pick.

References

Pittsburgh Penguins seasons
Pittsburgh Penguins
Penguins
Penguins